The following is a list of suspensions in the National Football League (NFL). Most NFL suspensions have been for players, but several coaches, owners, general managers, and game officials have also been suspended.

In 1997, in the wake of the O. J. Simpson murder trial, the league under Commissioner Paul Tagliabue adopted a Violent Crime Policy which gave the league broad powers to fine and suspend players for violent crimes but only after a conviction. In 2000, the league revised its Violent Crime Policy to allow the league to suspend for non-violent crimes and other off-the-field actions. This was the Personal Conduct Policy.

After Roger Goodell became commissioner in 2006, the league began cracking down on players performing violent hits, as well as handing out more frequent suspensions for violating the league's personal conduct and substance abuse policies. In March 2007, Goodell introduced a revised Personal Conduct Policy which strengthened the existing conduct rules. Following the 2011 NFL season, Goodell handed down one of the most severe suspensions in league history when he suspended eight players and coaches for their involvement in the New Orleans Saints bounty scandal.

Player suspensions

Suspensions for violating the substance policies
The NFL has two separate policies for substances that can lead to suspension. One policy concerns the use of banned drugs that are specifically indicated to improve athletic performance, performance-enhancing drugs (PEDs). The other policy concerns "substances of abuse" and includes drugs that may not enhance performance, but are indulged in for recreational purposes, including alcohol and marijuana related incidents.

Coach suspensions

Official, executive, and administrative suspensions

Footnotes

See also

 National Football League controversies
 National Football League player conduct controversy
 Steroid use in American football
 List of players banned or suspended by the NBA
 List of people banned from Major League Baseball
 List of Major League Baseball players suspended for performance-enhancing drugs

References

External links
 

Suspensions
 
National Football League coaches